The National Bloc was a right-wing electoral alliance formed for the 1948 Italian general election by the Italian Liberal Party and the Common Man's Front.

History
The alliance scored a poor 3.8% in the election for the House, gaining 16 seats, while a 5.4% was reached for the Senate where the single-man constituencies and the age-restricted suffrage gave an advantage to this list formed by old pre-fascist politicians. The list generally suffered the concurrence of Christian Democracy, which was seen by centrist and right-wing electors as the sole shield against the Soviet-aligned Popular Democratic Front.

The alliance soon disappeared, leaving only  as a party with some electoral support.

Composition
It was composed of the following political parties:

Election results

References

Political parties established in 1948
Defunct political party alliances in Italy